Burbiškiai Manor is a former residential manor in Burbiškiai village, Raseiniai district in Lithuania. 

The Main manor building, Two of three outbuildings, park fragments and manor cemetery have been conserved. Burbiškiai Manor is famous for its annual flowers festival.

References

Manor houses in Lithuania
Classicism architecture in Lithuania